Mohd Rizal Fahmi bin Ab Rosid (born 1 May 1986) is a Malaysian professional footballer who plays as a centre back for Malaysia M3 League side Imigresen.

Rizal began his footballing career with the Kelantan youth team in 2003. In 2006 he made his debut for the senior team, going on to make 115 appearances over a six-year period.

Club career

Kelantan
On 23 May 2012, he scored 1 stunning free kick goal in a 3–2 over Terengganu in 2012 AFC Cup knockout stage. With that victory Kelantan progressed to the quarter-finals where they played Arbil FC, losing 6–2 on aggregate.

Selangor 
On 10 November 2013, Rizal moved from Kelantan to Selangor for an undisclosed fee. Over a four-year stay with the club Rizal played 46 times, scoring three goals.

Career statistics

Club statistics

Style of play
Rizal Fahmi is one of Kelantan's free kick specialist. He made goals through free kick.

Honours

Clubs
Kelantan
 Malaysia Cup (2) : 2010, 2012
 Sultan Haji Ahmad Shah Cup (Charity Shield Malaysia) (1) : 2011
 Malaysia Super League (2) : 2011, 2012
 FA Cup (1) : 2012, 2013

References

External links
 Rizal Fahmi Rosid at SoccerPunter.com
 
 

1986 births
Living people
Malaysian footballers
Kelantan FA players
Selangor FA players
Negeri Sembilan FA players
People from Kelantan
Malaysian people of Malay descent
Association football central defenders